On 18–19 December 1669, a battle took place in the waters near Cádiz between the English fourth-rate frigate Mary Rose under the command of Rear-Admiral John Kempthorne, escorting several merchantmen, and a group of seven pirate ships operating out of Algiers. The incident was recorded and drawn by the engraver Wenceslaus Hollar, with an engraving appearing in John Ogilby's Africa.

The action occurred while the Mary Rose was returning from a diplomatic mission to Mulay Rashid (referred to as "Tafiletta" in early English sources), the sultan of Morocco, that had been conducted by Lord Henry Howard, with Hollar accompanying him in order to complete some drawings and maps of Tangier that he had begun some years earlier. The frigate was towing a merchant ship, the King David, that Kempthorne had recaptured from Barbary pirates, and was accompanied by five other vessels. The convoy encountered a group of seven pirate ships on 18 December 1669, with six attacking the Mary Rose while one pursued the King David that Kempthorne had cut loose. The pirates withdrew as night fell, resuming their attack on the morning of the 19th. Despite the Mary Rose sustaining damage to all three masts, she held off the attack, and the pirates withdrew, capturing only the King David. After repairs at Cádiz the Mary Rose returned to England in April 1670, and Kempthorne was knighted for "his very great valour". A version of Hollar's engraving of the battle was done by Willem van de Velde the Younger.

Background
The Mary Rose, a fourth-rate frigate of the English Royal Navy carrying forty-eight guns, conveyed Lord Henry Howard, with an entourage of 70 attendants and £4000 in gifts, to Tangier in 1668 or 1669. The visit was on the order of Charles II to negotiate a commercial treaty with the sultan of Morocco, Al-Rashid, also known as "Tafiletta". The engraver Wenceslaus Hollar formed part of the expedition on his own request to finish drawings of Tangier he had started when he accompanied Howard's grandfather on a similar mission in 1636. The meeting with Mulay Rashid was delayed for eleven months and ended up not taking place at all; then, according to Hollar, Howard obtained a "Letter of Security" from Mulay Rashid and "purposd himself" to "go by Land, and the Ship by Sea to Salee" from where they "set Sail on Wednesday the eighth of the said Month at two a clock in the morning".

The Mary Rose was accompanied by three ships: a small narrow-sterned ship of shallow draught or pink, the two-masted Roe ketch which had come from England with her, and a Hamburg merchantman, called the "Hamborough frigate." They passed Asilah that evening. After midnight, they overtook a large flyboat of 300 tons, loaded with timber, tobacco, salt, and malt. This proved to be the King David, an English trader bound from New England to Cádiz. Off Cape St. Vincent, she had been captured by a party of Algerines or Barbary pirates, and the captain and crew were taken as slaves. When the Mary Rose and convoy found her, she carried a prize-crew of 22 Algerines, as well as one Russian and two Englishmen; Hollar writes that "we transported them aboard [the Mary Rose], and sent other men aboard her."

An English prize-crew was sent aboard, and the King David was to follow the convoy to Salé. However, the recaptured ship was both poorly built for speed and laden with cargo, and the Mary Rose was obliged to tow her, retarding the convoy's progress. Consequently, they did not arrive at Salé until the 11th, where they met a two-masted brigantine from Tangier with Englishmen aboard. This vessel told them that there was an insurrection in progress and that they could not land, and recommended that they try to pick up some of the people ashore. The convoy remained there until the 13th, though failing to bring anyone aboard as they were detained in Salé. A storm forced them to leave the shore, towing the brigantine astern. The storm continued for the next few days, during which, says Hollar, the Mary Rose took on the brigantine's crew and passengers and let her go. On the 15th they sighted Rota, but were unable to put in because of the contrary wind. On the 17th the convoy was joined by two merchantmen, one French and one Scottish, bound from the Canary Islands to Cádiz. Several times during these few days the Mary Rose saw two Algerine men of war; these merchantmen had also seen the men of war and come to the convoy for protection.

Battle

At dawn on the 18th, the Mary Rose sighted seven Algerine men of war. The Mary Rose immediately prepared for action, clearing the decks in order to work the guns, taking on the prize-crew of the King David and abandoning her to be driven by the wind, and throwing overboard anything that might prove a hindrance. The Algerine ships passed near noon; one of the prisoners, a Dutchman, identified them as the Golden Lion, Orange Tree, Half Moon, Seven Stars, White Horse, Blewhart, and Rose Leaf. The Half Moon, not built for speed and also loaded down with men, fell behind, and the others sent two boats to tow her; Admiral Kempthorne sent out a boat to intercept theirs, but the Algerines sent out another boat, well-armed, and Kempthorne recalled the English boat. The Algerine ships stood close together, and around 3:00 six of them attacked the Mary Rose, while the Rose Leaf chased the abandoned King David. Hollar described "a hot Service, and much harm done on both sides," until night fell and the Algerine ships retired.

Early the next morning the two groups engaged again. The Algerines approached in a line from the southeast: the Half Moon was first, and she and subsequent ships fired, both with broadsides from the ships' guns and with small-arms, on the Mary Rose before steering away to the northeast. According to Hollar's account, Mary Rose replied firing every other gun, in order to be able to keep up a consistent fire on all the approaching ships. Golden Lion, the Algerine flagship, was in the rear, intending to board. However, the Mary Rose hit her hull below the waterline with one shot and destroyed her mainsail with another, and she, along with the other Algerines, retreated. During the battle, the French and Scottish merchantmen escaped; a number of Jews and Armenians aboard the pink, according to Hollar, attempted to take the ship over to the Algerines, but the latter mistook it for a fire ship sent by the English to destroy them, and the attempt failed when the squadron retreated. The English casualties were twelve killed and eighteen wounded; according to Owen Hurst, the Mary Rose had all three masts damaged, and her mainmast, foremast, and both topmast yards disabled.

Aftermath
The Mary Rose arrived in Cádiz on the 20th. Kempthorne sold the 22 Algerine prisoners as slaves; two were bought by the English consul there. The Mary Rose returned to England in April 1670 with a thirty-ship convoy of Mediterranean trade and a cargo of silver, whereupon Kempthorne was knighted for "his very great valour and conduct shown against the pirates of Algiers." King David, which had been taken by the Rose Leaf, was recaptured by Sir Thomas Allin, who ordered her to be sold with her cargo as a prize at Málaga; the original owners successfully petitioned to have them restored. In July 1670, Charles II ordered that money earned from selling Moorish prisoners should henceforth be put into a fund for the redemption of Englishmen taken as slaves, beginning with King David'''s crew, including master Edward Clements and supercargo Jeremiah Armiger, who had put up three days' resistance before being captured. Sailors who had fought well were also to be given preference in the future.

Hollar, who reportedly sat on deck sketching during the action, later produced an etching of the battle, which was included in Ogilby's 1670 Africa. The picture shows the Algerine line engaging the Mary Rose and the Roe, while Rose Leaf chases King David to the southeast, the French merchantman escapes to the northwest, and the other merchantmen shelter behind the Mary Rose. Willem van de Velde the Younger soon after made his own drawing of the battle, based on Hollar's. A van de Velde oil painting based on Hollar's etching of the Mary Rose'' engagement is in the Royal Collection, where it has been held at least since 1687, and is currently (2013) on public display in the Queen's Private Dining Room at Hampton Court Royal Palace. A copy with the monogram of Adriaen van Diest inscribed on the reverse was with the Leger Galleries in London in 1973, and another is recorded as being in the collection at Castle Howard, North Yorkshire, England. This picture was possibly commissioned during Kempthorne's lifetime or by his family: alterations from the original were made to the flags in order to correct them. A painting signed by Peter Monamy in the National Maritime Museum has an inscription stating that it depicts this battle. It is more likely, however, that it was intended to depict a similar battle fought in 1681 by Morgan Kempthorne, John Kempthorne's son, in the Kingfisher.

Maritime music
Exaggerated references to this engagement have become fodder for a popular naval ballad sometimes titled "Turkish Men of War" or "The Royal Oak" sometimes sung with lyrics mixing up names and numbers of the ships involved.

See also
 Barbary corsairs

References

External links
 Website devoted to Hollar's engraving of the Mary Rose engagement

Naval battles involving Ottoman Algeria
Naval battles involving England
Conflicts in 1669
Barbary pirates
Battle
1669 in Africa
1669 in the British Empire